Anochetus paripungens is a species of ant of the subfamily Ponerinae. It can be found in northern Australia.

References

Ponerinae
Hymenoptera of Australia
Insects described in 1978